The Defining Moment (沸腾冰点) is a Singaporean drama which aired on Channel 8, debuted on 4 August 2008, and consists of 20 episodes.

Cast

 Fann Wong as Lin Kexin:Rui En was originally cast as Lin Kexin but Rui En rejected the role due to intimate scenes. The role then went to Fann.
 Jeanette Aw as Lin Keyi
 Andie Chen as Lin Kexi
 Zhu Houren as Tang Weiye

Pierre Png
Thomas Ng
Xiang Yun
Darren Lim
Ng Hui

Accolades

References

External links
The Defining Moment on MediaCorp

Singapore Chinese dramas
2008 Singaporean television series debuts
2008 Singaporean television series endings
Channel 8 (Singapore) original programming